The Chevrolet Tracker is an automotive nameplate that has been used by Chevrolet for two different vehicle lines.

 Chevrolet Tracker (Americas), compact SUV produced since 1988, spanning two generations based on the Suzuki Vitara/Escudo/Sidekick
 Chevrolet Trax, subcompact crossover that is marketed as the Tracker in South America and Russia until 2020
 Chevrolet Tracker (2019), subcompact crossover for Chinese and Latin American markets, replacing the Chevrolet Trax

Tracker
Cars introduced in 1988